Robyn Silvernagle (born May 20, 1987) is a Canadian curler from Unity, Saskatchewan.

Career
Silvernagle represented Saskatchewan at the 2005 Canadian Junior Curling Championships, finishing the event with a 7–5 record and missing the playoffs.

Silvernagle has skipped her own team since the 2009–10 curling season. Her team won the 2010 Cornerstone Credit Union Ladies Cash Bonspiel. After joining Brett Barber's rink as a third for the 2012–13 curling season and then the Brenda Goertzen rink as fourth during the 2014–15 curling season, Silvernagle skipped her own team for the 2015–16 curling season. Her new team found some success winning the qualifier and coming third overall in the 2016 Saskatchewan Scotties Tournament of Hearts. The next year Silvernagle's team lost the final of the 2017 Saskatchewan Scotties Tournament of Hearts to Penny Barker. After winning the 2017 Boundary Ford Curling Classic, Silvernagle once again lost the Saskatchewan Scotties final, this time in an extra end against Sherry Anderson.

For the 2018–19 curling season, Silvernagle and lead Kara Thevenot added veteran third Stefanie Lawton and second Jessie Hunkin to their team. Silvernagle's team had a strong start to the season, winning the 2018 Red Deer Curling Classic and Saskatchewan Women's Curling Tour events in Humboldt and Saskatoon. With the 2019 Canadian Open being held in North Battleford, Silvernagle qualified for her first Grand Slam event as the sponsor's exemption. Silvernagle qualified for the playoffs with a 3–1 record in the triple knockout format, before losing to Silvana Tirinzoni in the quarter-final.

Silvernagle won the 2019 Saskatchewan Scotties Tournament of Hearts with a steal in the final end against Sherry Anderson, her first provincial title. Representing Saskatchewan at the 2019 Scotties Tournament of Hearts, Silvernagle went 8–3 in the round robin and championship pools, before eventually losing the semi-final to Ontario and winning the bronze medal. The rink had semi-final and quarterfinal finishes at the 2019 Players' Championship and the 2019 Champions Cup respectively.

Team Silvernagle missed the playoffs in the first two Slams of the 2019–20 season, the Masters and the Tour Challenge. She also competed in her first Canada Cup where her team finished with a 1–5 record. They defended their provincial title at the 2020 Saskatchewan Scotties Tournament of Hearts when they once again bested Sherry Anderson in the final. At the 2020 Scotties Tournament of Hearts, Team Silvernagle led Saskatchewan to a 6–5 record, finishing in fifth. It would be the team's last event of the season as both the Players' Championship and the Champions Cup Grand Slam events were cancelled due to the COVID-19 pandemic. On March 11, 2020, the team announced that Lawton would be stepping back from competitive curling and Thevenot would be leaving the team. Five days later, Silvernagle and Hunkin announced that Kristen Streifel and Dayna Demers would be joining them for the following season.

Due to the COVID-19 pandemic in Saskatchewan, the 2021 Saskatchewan Scotties Tournament of Hearts was cancelled. Despite being the defending provincial champions, Team Silvernagle did not retain three out of four team members from the previous season and could therefore not qualify as the provincial representatives. Team Sherry Anderson was then invited to represent Saskatchewan at the 2021 Scotties Tournament of Hearts, as they had the most points from the 2019–20 and 2020–21 seasons combined, which they accepted. This ended the abbreviated 2020–21 season for the newly formed Silvernagle rink.

On maternity leave, Silvernagle did not play with her team for the first few events of the 2021–22 season. Jessie Hunkin took over skipping duties during this time, with Becca Hebert coming in to throw second. Due to the COVID-19 pandemic in Canada, the qualification process for the 2021 Canadian Olympic Curling Trials had to be modified to qualify enough teams for the championship. In these modifications, Curling Canada created the 2021 Canadian Curling Pre-Trials Direct-Entry Event, an event where eight teams would compete to try to earn one of two spots into the 2021 Canadian Olympic Curling Pre-Trials. Team Silvernagle qualified for the Pre-Trials Direct-Entry Event as the third seed. The team qualified for the playoffs through the B Event, giving them two chances to secure a spot in the Pre-Trials. They then, however, lost 10–8 to Kerry Galusha and 8–6 to Jill Brothers, finishing third and not advancing. With Silvernagle back in the lineup, the team qualified for three straight quarterfinals at the Boundary Ford Curling Classic, the SaskTour Women's Moose Jaw event and the Red Deer Curling Classic. In December 2021, they won the Swift Current Women's Spiel, defeating Michelle Englot 8–3 in the championship game. In the new year, Team Silvernagle competed in the 2022 Saskatchewan Scotties Tournament of Hearts where they entered as the third seeds. They qualified for the playoffs through the C Event before being eliminated by Amber Holland in the 3 vs. 4 page playoff game.

Personal life
Silvernagle is married to Chad Guidinger and is the owner of Dazu Salon. She has one son, Kolt, that she gave birth to in September 2021.

Grand Slam record

Teams

References

External links

1987 births
Living people
Canadian women curlers
Curlers from Saskatchewan
Sportspeople from North Battleford
People from Biggar, Saskatchewan
Canada Cup (curling) participants